This is a list of episodes and episode summaries for the Macross Frontier anime series.

Episodes

Frontier episodes
Macross Frontier